Kevin Joseph Shegog (20 August 1933 – 9 November 2000) was an Australian country music singer. He is perhaps most well known for his cover of Claude King's hit Wolverton Mountain and his singles One Small Photograph and Little Kangaroo.

Early life
Shegog was born in Lower Turner Marsh near Launceston, Tasmania to Joseph and Elvie Shegog (née Briant). When he was nine years old, Shegog taught himself how to play the guitar. He was also a member of the choir at school. At the age of fourteen, he started performing at venues and began to write his own songs.

Personal life
Shegog was married to Shirley (née Haas) (d. 1981) and they had five children, Dallas, Susan, Lorena, Angela and Travis. They lived in Melbourne. He was a distant cousin of Vivian Bullwinkel.

Death
Shegog died on 9 November 2000 at the age of 67 from complications of a stroke he suffered 7 years earlier.

Legacy
In 1983, Shegog was inducted into the Australian Country Music 'Hands of Fame' cornerstone.

Discography

Singles

Compilations

References

External links 
 Kevin Shegog at the Country Music Hall of Fame Website (Australia)

1933 births
2000 deaths
Australian baritones
Australian country singer-songwriters
Musicians from Tasmania
20th-century Australian male singers
Australian male singer-songwriters